This is a list of historic bridges in the U.S. State of Nebraska.

Bridges

See also
 :Category:State highways in Nebraska

References

 
Bridges
Bridges
Nebraska